Darłowiec  is a settlement in the administrative district of Gmina Darłowo, within Sławno County, West Pomeranian Voivodeship, in northwestern Poland.

For the region's history, see History of Pomerania.

The settlement has a population of 14.

References

Villages in Sławno County